Nikolai Nikolayevich Krivoruchko (Russian, Николай Николаевич Криворучко; December 6, 1887 – August 19, 1938) was a Soviet Komkor (corps commander). He fought in the Imperial Russian Army in World War I before going over to the Bolsheviks during the subsequent civil war. He was a recipient of the Order of Lenin and the Order of the Red Banner. During the Great Purge, he was arrested on February 21, 1938 and later executed.

Awards 

 Order of Lenin (1935)
 Two Orders of the Red Banner (11.11.1921, 31.10.1930)

Memorial 

 In Uman (Cherkasy region, Ukraine) there is street called Krivoruchko.

References

 Кольцов С. В. «М. М. Криворучко» — Дніпропетровськ: Промінь, 1969.
 Социокультурный состав советской военной элиты 1931—1938 гг. и её оценки в прессе русского зарубежья
 Расстрелянная элита РККА|84—85

1887 births
1938 deaths
People from Cherkasy Oblast
People from Kiev Governorate
Soviet komkors
Russian military personnel of World War I
Soviet military personnel of the Russian Civil War
Frunze Military Academy alumni
Recipients of the Order of Lenin
Recipients of the Order of the Red Banner
Great Purge victims from Ukraine
People executed by the Soviet Union
Soviet rehabilitations